Achaetobotrys is a genus of fungi within the Antennulariellaceae family.

References 

Capnodiales
Dothideomycetes genera